The 1864 United States presidential election in Pennsylvania took place on November 8, 1864, as part of the 1864 United States presidential election. Voters chose 26 representatives, or electors to the Electoral College, who voted for president and vice president.

Pennsylvania voted for the National Union candidate, Abraham Lincoln, over the Democratic candidate, George B. McClellan. Lincoln won Pennsylvania by a narrow margin of 3.5%.

Results

See also
 List of United States presidential elections in Pennsylvania

References

Pennsylvania
1864
1864 Pennsylvania elections